Lane Douglas Lambert (born November 18, 1964) is a Canadian professional ice hockey coach and former player. He is the head coach for the New York Islanders of the National Hockey League (NHL). Drafted 25th overall in the second round of the 1983 NHL Entry Draft, Lambert played 283 games in the NHL for the Quebec Nordiques, New York Rangers, and Detroit Red Wings between 1983 and 1989.

Coaching career
Lambert was hired as the head coach of the Milwaukee Admirals of the American Hockey League (AHL) in July 2007,  a position he held until he was promoted as an assistant coach for the Nashville Predators on June 9, 2011. He was also an assistant coach with the Washington Capitals during their 2018 Stanley Cup run, however he signed with the New York Islanders after head coach Barry Trotz signed with the team in 2018.

After Trotz's firing following the 2021–22 season, on May 16, 2022, Lambert was promoted to head coach of the Islanders.

Awards
 WHL Second All-Star Team – 1983

Career statistics

Regular season and playoffs

Personal life
Lambert was born in Melfort, Saskatchewan. His wife died on September 16, 2015, from breast cancer. They had one daughter together and Lambert has another daughter from a previous marriage.

Lane and his third wife have four children.

Lane has two brothers, Dale and Ross, who also played ice hockey. His nephew Jimmy played for the University of Michigan, while his other nephew, Brad, was selected 30th overall by the Winnipeg Jets in the 2022 NHL Entry Draft.

References

External links
 

1964 births
Living people
Adirondack Red Wings players
Canadian ice hockey coaches
Canadian ice hockey forwards
Cleveland Lumberjacks players
Detroit Red Wings draft picks
Detroit Red Wings players
Düsseldorfer EG players
Halifax Citadels players
HC Ajoie players
HC La Chaux-de-Fonds players
Houston Aeros (1994–2013) players
Ice hockey people from Saskatchewan
Milwaukee Admirals coaches
Nashville Predators coaches
New Haven Nighthawks players
New York Islanders coaches
New York Rangers players
People from Melfort, Saskatchewan
Prince George Cougars coaches
Quebec Nordiques players
SC Langnau players
Stanley Cup champions
Saskatoon Blades players
Swift Current Broncos players
Washington Capitals coaches